Callionymus meridionalis, the whiteflag dragonet, is a species of dragonet native to the western Pacific Ocean where it occurs down to depths of .  This species grows to a length of  SL.

References 

M
Fish described in 1965